Kalif Raymond (born August 8, 1994) is an American football wide receiver for the Detroit Lions of the National Football League (NFL). He was born in Lawrenceville, Georgia, U.S. to an African-American father and a Chinese mother. He played college football at Holy Cross and was signed by the Denver Broncos as an undrafted free agent in 2016.

Professional career

Denver Broncos
On May 3, 2016, the Denver Broncos signed Raymond as an undrafted free agent. He was released on September 3, 2016 during the final roster cuts and was later signed to the practice squad. He was promoted to active roster on December 2, 2016.

On September 2, 2017, Raymond was waived by the Broncos.

New York Jets
Raymond was claimed off waivers by the New York Jets on September 3, 2017. 

In the season opener against the Buffalo Bills, Raymond was the kickoff and punt returner in his Jets debut.

Raymond was waived on September 19, 2017 and was re-signed to the practice squad. He was released by the team on September 26, 2017.

New York Giants
On October 11, 2017, Raymond was signed to the New York Giants' practice squad. He was released on October 31, 2017, but re-signed the next day. He was promoted to the active roster on November 14, 2017.

On September 1, 2018, Raymond was waived by the Giants.

Tennessee Titans
On September 25, 2018, Raymond was signed to the Tennessee Titans' practice squad. He was released on October 2, 2018.

New York Giants (second stint)
On October 16, 2018, Raymond was signed to the Giants practice squad, but was released two days later.

Tennessee Titans (second stint)

On December 24, 2018, Raymond was signed to the Titans practice squad. He signed a reserve/future contract with the Titans on December 31, 2018.

On September 7, 2019, Raymond was waived by the Titans and was re-signed to the practice squad. He was promoted to the active roster on October 26, 2019. During Week 10 against the Kansas City Chiefs, Raymond caught a 52-yard reception from Ryan Tannehill and returned three kicks for 46 yards in a 35-32 victory. On December 1, 2019, he scored his first NFL touchdown on a 40-yard pass from Tannehill in a 31-17 road victory over the Indianapolis Colts. Raymond gave the football to his mother who was in attendance at the Week 13 game. On the 2019 season, Raymond totaled nine receptions for 170 receiving yards and one touchdown in eight games. In the Divisional Round of the playoffs against the Baltimore Ravens, he caught a 45-yard touchdown during the 28–12 road victory.

In Week 3 of the 2020 season, Raymond had three receptions for 118 yards in the 31–30 victory over the Minnesota Vikings. He was placed on the reserve/COVID-19 list by the Titans on December 19, 2020, and activated on December 25.

Detroit Lions
On March 25, 2021, Raymond signed with the Detroit Lions.

On October 3, 2021, Raymond scored two touchdowns in a 24-14 loss to the Chicago Bears.

On March 18, 2022, Raymond signed a two-year, $9.5 million contract extension with the Lions.

On December 18, 2022, Raymond ran 47 yards for his first career punt-return touchdown in a 20-17 win agianst his former team, the New York Jets.

NFL statistics

References

External links
Holy Cross Crusaders bio

1994 births
Living people
People from Lawrenceville, Georgia
Sportspeople from the Atlanta metropolitan area
Players of American football from Georgia (U.S. state)
American football wide receivers
Holy Cross Crusaders football players
Denver Broncos players
New York Jets players
New York Giants players
Tennessee Titans players
Detroit Lions players